John Bourchier may refer to:

John de Bourchier (d.circa 1330), English judge
John Bourchier, 2nd Baron Bourchier (died 1400), English peer
John Bourchier, 1st Baron Berners (died 1474), English peer
John Bourchier, 2nd Baron Berners (1467–1533), one of Henry VIII's Chancellors of the Exchequer
John Bourchier, 1st Earl of Bath (1470–1539)
John Bourchier (bishop-designate) (died in/around 1577)
Sir John Bourchier (died 1495) (c. 1438–1495), Baron Ferrers of Groby in right of his wife Elizabeth Grey, Baroness Ferrers of Groby
John Bourchier, 2nd Earl of Bath (1499–1561)
John Bourchier (MP for Hull) (1567–1626), MP for Kingston upon Hull, 1614
John Bourchier (regicide) (c. 1595–1660), English Puritan and regicide of Charles I
John Bourchier (politician) (1929–2017)